Northern Colorado is the name for a region in the state of Colorado and a proposed state in the northeastern portion of Colorado.

Region
Northern Colorado is a region in the northern portion of Colorado. It borders northwestern Colorado, northeastern Colorado, the northern portion of Central Colorado, western and southwestern portions of Nebraska, and the southeastern portion of Wyoming. Northern Colorado receives over 300 days of sunshine per year and has a semi-arid climate. However, the parts located in upper elevations of the Rocky Mountains receive  of snow per year and have an Alpine climate. The University of Colorado Boulder, Colorado State University, and the University of Northern Colorado are all located in Northern Colorado.

Counties

Adams County
Arapahoe County
Boulder County
Broomfield City-County
Cheyenne County
Elbert County
Jackson County
Kit Carson County
Larimer County
Lincoln County
Logan County
Morgan County
Phillips County
Sedgwick County
Washington County
Weld County 
Yuma County

Larger cities
 Boulder
 Broomfield
 Fort Collins 
 Greeley
 Longmont
 Loveland

Potential state

North Colorado or Northern Colorado is a proposed new U.S. state which would consist of several counties in the northeast portion of Colorado  and possible counties from Nebraska and Kansas.

A University of Colorado law professor has indicated that an additional step would be required beyond the approval of the state legislature and the U.S. Congress as the Colorado Constitution defines the state’s boundaries, thus requiring a vote on a constitutional amendment.

Background
A County Commissioner of Weld County stated his belief that the county sends more oil and gas revenue to the state than it receives back for schools, roads, and other services. In 2013 the Democratic-controlled Colorado General Assembly passed tighter gun control laws, higher renewable energy reliance laws, and livestock treatment laws. A higher environmental standard oil and gas production law was narrowly defeated. During the debates over these laws, talk of secession began in the Eastern Plains area. At a meeting of the state's county commissioners in early June, a State House leader indicated that they would attempt to pass the oil environmental standards law again. This brought the secession discussion to a higher level with Weld County Commissioners Mike Freeman, Sean Conway, and Douglas Rademacher leading the proposal with a hearing scheduled regarding counties placing secession questions on the November 2013 ballot.

History

Along with Weld County, several other counties were invited to or interested in being involved with this proposal: Morgan, Logan, Sedgwick, Phillips, Washington, Yuma, and Kit Carson. Also interested in joining the new state are parts of Nebraska. Colorado's Eastern Plain counties all may possibly be involved in the split, but Larimer County Commissioners indicated that their county would not likely approve of a split.

On July 8, 2013 a meeting of representatives from 10 counties was held in Akron, Colorado to begin setting the boundaries of the potential state. The news media reported that some people in Lincoln and Cheyenne counties wish to join in forming the state. Additionally, the organizers reported that three other Colorado and two Kansas counties also wish to join in forming the state. The county commissioners involved discussed an alternative plan if breaking away is not feasible. This alternative would be to change the Colorado Constitution to have one state senator per county;  however, the U. S. Supreme Court invalidated such representation by county in Reynolds v. Sims (1964) as a violation of the one man, one vote principle.

Cheyenne County – outside the original proposed area – became the first county to refer the measure to the people on July 23, 2013.  A total of eleven counties placed the measure on the November 5, 2013, ballot.  Voters in Cheyenne, Kit Carson, Phillips, Washington, and Yuma counties approved the measure.

Counties

Ballot initiative counties
Cheyenne 
Elbert
Kit Carsoni
Lincoln
Logani
Moffat
Phillipsi
Sedgwicki
Washingtoni
Weldi
Yumai
Kansas counties - under consideration
Cheyenne
Wallace
Other counties
Morgani
i. initial invited county

References

External links
51st State Initiative - secession campaign group 

Politics of Colorado
Proposed states and territories of the United States
Regions of Colorado
Separatism in the United States
2013 in Colorado
2013 in American politics